Chris Reed (born 30 October 1982), also known as Plastician (formerly Plasticman), is an electronic musician from Thornton Heath in the London Borough of Croydon.

History
Plastician, real name Chris Reed is a DJ from Croydon in South London. He began playing UK garage records in 2000, playing early shows in the local area of Croydon. Reed began to take interest in the darker side of the sound, specialising in sets featuring tracks from the likes of Wookie, Zed Bias, El-B, Groove Chronicles, Steve Gurley and working alongside MCs Tricks & Spellz as part of the "Fearless Crew". They held radio slots on South London's inconsistent pirate station "Desire FM" before moving to 2GFM before the split of Fearless Crew in 2002. It was then that Reed was to begin using the name Plasticman for future works, which he later changed to Plastician due to the similarity to Canadian-British techno artist Richie Hawtin's "Plastikman".

Toward the middle of 2001, Reed had been experimenting with production on FruityLoops. Being based in Croydon, Reed was part of a close-knit community of young producers attempting to make dark garage tracks that would catch the ear of Big Apple Records resident DJ Hatcha so that he could support them on his popular pirate radio show. Other young producers in this circle included Skream and Benga, amongst more experienced heads Artwork / Menta, Benny Ill & Horsepower Productions. By the end of 2001, although Plasticman's tracks were somewhat overlooked by DJ Hatcha, they were however picked up by East London Grime pioneer, DJ Slimzee. Slimzee signed Reed's first 12" release (Venom / Shockwave) to his Slimzos imprint which was released early into 2002.

By 2003, Reed had been supported by DJ Hatcha on tracks such as Hard Graft, which saw his grimy take on the instrumental sound being welcomed by the FWD contingent, leading to releases on Ammunition Promotions' Soulja, and ROAD imprints, a weekly slot on Rinse FM alongside Mark One (MRK1) & Virus Syndicate, and in the summer saw Reed's first appearance at the world-famous FWD event at Plastic People, London. Soon after, Reed had established himself as a FWD favourite and was announced as one of 4 residents at the club in 2004, alongside Dubstep royalty, DJ Hatcha, Youngsta and Rinse FM owner, DJ Geeneus.

In 2006, Reed was offered a slot on BBC Radio 1's "The Residency". This soon turned into "In New DJ's We Trust". This was the tipping point for an ongoing legal struggle which forced him to change his name from Plasticman to Plastician. He spent 18 months on the station before returning to Rinse FM to continue his weekly slot, which he had been continuing under the alias "Blue Stripe" during his time at the BBC. He returned to the airwaves on Rinse FM alongside MC Nomad.

2007 saw the release of "Beg to Differ", Reed's debut LP and his first release under the Plastician moniker. It received critical acclaim, and contains some of Reed's most recognisable works such as "Japan" and "Intensive Snare" with North London MC Skepta of Boy Better Know.

Plastician also played a role in putting together the "Cashmere Agency Presents Mr. Grustle & Tha Russian Dubstep LA Embrace The Renaissance Vol.1 Mixed by Dj Plastician" mixtape that was released in June 2009. The tracks were curated by Plastician and featured Dubstep and Hip Hop collaborations involving Snoop Dogg, Xzibit and more. Plastician is unique in that he is respected as one of the true pioneers of both the Dubstep and Grime genres.

Terrorhythm Recordings
Plastician runs his own record label, Terrorhythm Recordings, formed in 2002. Best known for signing both Om Unit and Joker's first releases as well as releasing Plastician's critically acclaimed Beg to Differ album, it also saw early releases from Macabre Unit, Maniac, Crissy Criss, and Mark One. Moving into more recent times, the label has broadened its sonic palate – as has Plastician. Terrorhythm currently represents some of the most exciting young musicians associated with today's future beats movement, housing artists such as AWE, GANZ, Louis Futon and Krane among others within its ranks; many of whom have been releasing on the label since their debut releases. More recently, Plastician has been exploring the experimental trap offshoot, wave music for which his "Wavepool" mixes have become recognized as the main reference point for the birth of the genre. He has recruited artists representing the wave sound such as Noah B, Sorsari, Deadcrow, Glacci, & Yedgar to release via Terrorhythm and bring the underground internet sound to new ears from 2016 onward.

Terrorhythm Recordings releases

References

External links
 Terrorythm recordings
 Download or listen Plasticians's – Sound That Speaks Volumes 2011

1982 births
Dubstep musicians
English electronic musicians
DJs from London
English record producers
Living people